Lot 22 is a township in Queens County, Prince Edward Island, Canada.  It is part of Greenville Parish. Lot 22 was awarded to John Gordon and William Ridge in the 1767 land lottery.

Communities

Incorporated municipalities:

 Darlington
 Hunter River
 Stanley Bridge, Hope River, Bayview, Cavendish and North Rustico

Civic address communities:

 Bayview
 Cavendish
 Darlington
 Fredericton
 Hartsville
 Hazel Grove
 Hope River
 Hunter River
 Millvale
 Rennies Road
 Springton
 St. Ann
 St. Patricks
 Stanley Bridge
 Toronto

References

22
Geography of Queens County, Prince Edward Island